The Hilltopper Sports Satellite Network (HSSN) is a viewer-supported, student-run, and seasonal syndicated programming service based in Bowling Green, Kentucky. It features live broadcasts of men's and women's college basketball events of the Western Kentucky Hilltoppers, the sporting team representing Western Kentucky University. The institution is currently a member of Conference USA.

History 
Founded prior to the 1999-2000 season, HSSN, who works through a partnership with Western Kentucky University, the WKU Athletic Department, and university-operated PBS member station WKYU-TV, has helped the Hilltoppers make over 150 appearances since 2010. While WKYU-TV serves as the flagship station, Louisville-based independent station WBNA (formerly an Ion Television affiliate) serves as an affiliate to make WKU Basketball games available in the Louisville metropolitan area.

While a member of the Sun Belt Conference previously, some WKU Basketball games aired on WKYU-TV were syndicated by Creative Sports (later ESPN Plus) during the 1990s and 2000s. Sometimes, the HSSN package competed with Jefferson Pilot/Lincoln Financial Media (now Raycom Sports) broadcasts of Southeastern Conference sporting events and ESPN Plus-operated SEC TV on ABC affiliate WBKO from the 1990s until 2014.

Game broadcasts
The HSSN's basketball broadcasts are mainly an audio simulcast of game broadcasts of the Hilltopper Sports Network, with the live video being simulcasted from ESPN+, who broadcasts most of WKU's games regionally, or in some cases, nationally via satellite and/or cable television, some of which most major cable and satellite providers offered as part of an out-of-market sports package. Fox College Sports was the previous regional broadcaster for select WKU games until the end of the 2017-18 season.

WKYU-TV programs HSSN broadcasts of WKU basketball from early December to early March. Historically, the HSSN broadcast package mostly Western Kentucky Hilltoppers men's basketball games, but its season package often included some women's basketball games as well. In 2015, the HSSN purchased a $2 million fully-high-definition mobile production facility, making the game broadcasts available in full 16:9 high definition. Since 2014, WKYU-TV also broadcast WKU-involved matches broadcast by the American Sports Network and its successor, Stadium, an ad hoc syndication service owned and operated by Sinclair Broadcasting Group, which owns Nashville Fox affiliate WZTV and MyNetworkTV affiliate WUXP-TV, that can be received over-the-air in Bowling Green.

Affiliates

Current

Former

Funding and Sponsorship 
Because HSSN flagship WKYU-TV is a viewer-supported television station, the HSSN was mainly funded by local merchants who are supporters of the sports teams of WKU, as well as some WKU Hilltopper fans that view the games via television, especially those who live within the Bowling Green media market.

Sponsors
Houchens Industries 
Prairie Farms 
Minit Mart Foods Inc.

See also 
WKYU-TV 
Hilltopper IMG Sports Network

References

External links
Official Website of WKU Athletics

  

Western Kentucky Hilltoppers basketball
Western Kentucky Lady Toppers basketball
Sports television in the United States
Television channels and stations established in 1999
Simulcasts
1999 establishments in Kentucky